Skjeldal is a Norwegian surname. Notable people with the surname include:

Gudmund Skjeldal (born 1970), Norwegian cross-country skier and writer
Kristen Skjeldal (born 1967), Norwegian cross-country skier

Norwegian-language surnames